The 1985 Asian Basketball Confederation Championship for Men was held from December 28, 1985, to January 5, 1986, in Kuala Lumpur, Malaysia.

Preliminary round

Group A

Group B

Group C

Group D

Final round

Classification 13th–15th

Classification 9th–12th

Classification 5th–8th

Championship

Final standing

Awards

Most Valuable Player:  Allan Caidic
All-Star Team:
  Zhang Bin
  Sun Fengwu
  Avelino Lim
  Lee Chung-hee
  Allan Caidic

References

External links
 Results
 archive.fiba.com

Asia Championship, 1985
1985
B
B
December 1985 sports events in Asia
January 1986 sports events in Asia